Delano Williams (born 23 December 1993) is a British sprinter, originally from the British Overseas Territory of the Turks and Caicos Islands. In June 2013, it was confirmed that Williams would henceforth compete for Great Britain, as was his right by dint of the right to British citizenship of Turks and Caicos Islanders. Williams trains with the Racers Track Club in Jamaica.

Career
He attended Munro College in St Elizabeth, Jamaica. He joined the college after a Jamaican talent scout spotted his speed in a baseball game in his native Turks and Caicos.

Williams aimed to compete for Great Britain in the 200 metres at the 2012 Summer Olympics. He cannot represent his native Turks and Caicos Islands, because they are not recognised by the International Olympic Committee, however, using a similar by-law to Anguillan long jumper Shara Proctor, Williams is eligible to represent Great Britain as Turks and Caicos are a British Overseas Territory. He finished fifth at the UK Olympics Trials, so was not selected. He competed for Great Britain in the 2016 Rio Summer Olympics.

Born and raised on Grand Turk Island to a Haitian mother, Williams moved to Jamaica in 2008. Running for Munro College, he won the 100 and 200 metres at the 2012 Jamaican National High School Track and Field Championships, becoming the first non-national to do so.

He did, however, represent Turks and Caicos at the 2012 World Junior Championships in Athletics in Barcelona, Spain. He won a gold medal in the 200 metres.

References

External links

1993 births
Living people
Turks and Caicos Islands male sprinters
Athletes (track and field) at the 2010 Commonwealth Games
Commonwealth Games competitors for the Turks and Caicos Islands
World Athletics Championships athletes for Great Britain
World Athletics Championships medalists
Turks and Caicos Islands emigrants to Jamaica
Turks and Caicos Islands people of Haitian descent
British people of Haitian descent
European Athletics Championships medalists
Athletes (track and field) at the 2016 Summer Olympics
Olympic athletes of Great Britain